Methyl benzoate is an organic compound.  It is an ester with the chemical formula C6H5CO2CH3.  It is a colorless liquid that is poorly soluble in water, but miscible with organic solvents.  Methyl benzoate has a pleasant smell, strongly reminiscent of the fruit of the feijoa tree, and it is used in perfumery.  It also finds use as a solvent and as a pesticide used to attract insects such as orchid bees.

Synthesis and reactions
Methyl benzoate is formed by the condensation of methanol and benzoic acid, in presence of a strong acid.  

Methyl benzoate reacts at both the ring and the ester, depending on the substrate. Electrophiles attack the ring, illustrated by acid-catalysed nitration with nitric acid to give methyl 3-nitrobenzoate. Nucleophiles attack the carbonyl center, illustrated by hydrolysis with addition of aqueous NaOH to give methanol and sodium benzoate.

Occurrence 
Methyl benzoate can be isolated from the freshwater fern Salvinia molesta.  It is one of many compounds that is attractive to males of various species of orchid bees, which apparently gather the chemical to synthesize pheromones; it is commonly used as bait to attract and collect these bees for study.

Cocaine hydrochloride hydrolyzes in moist air to give methyl benzoate; drug-sniffing dogs are thus trained to detect the smell of methyl benzoate.

Uses 
Non electric Heat cost allocators. See: DIN EN 835.

References 

Flavors
Methyl esters
Benzoate esters
Perfume ingredients